Sarn is a village (and electoral ward) in Bridgend County Borough, Wales, about  north of Bridgend and which lies just east of the confluence of the Ogmore and Llynfi rivers. It is located to the east of Aberkenfig, south of Brynmenyn, and south-east of Tondu. It is around 15 minutes' walk from the M4 and the McArthurGlen Group Bridgend Designer Outlet.

Description
Sarn is part of the community of St Bride's Minor, being the main shopping centre for the area, including a post office, supermarket and number of independent shops.

Although the Welsh Government classes Sarn as the urban area north of Bridgend which encompasses Aberkenfig, Bryncethin, Brynmenyn, Sarn, Tondu and Ynysawdre and has a total population of approximately 10,000, Sarn itself only has a population of 2500. Bridgend County Borough Council refers to the area North of Bridgend as the Valleys Gateway.

Education

The nearest primary schools are Bryncethin primary school, Brynmenyn Primary school, Tondu Primary school and the nearest comprehensive school is Coleg Cymunedol Y Dderwen, located in neighbouring village of Ynysawdre. The closest Welsh-medium school is Ysgol Gyfun Gymraeg Llangynwyd in Maesteg.

Transport
Sarn is served by Sarn railway station which was opened by British Rail on 28 September 1992. Passenger services were operated by Arriva Trains Wales and subsequently are operated by Transport for Wales as part of the Valley Lines network for local services on the Maesteg Line.

Bus Routes are served by First Cymru which has lines stopping by Sarn to travel too and from Nantymoel, Blaengarw and Bridgend. The Bridgend Designer Outlet has more routes which can take you up Cardiff, Swansea, Maesteg and Porthcawl

Governance
At the local level Sarn is a community ward to St Bride's Minor Community Council, electing up to six of the thirteen community councillors.

Sarn is also a ward electing a county councillor to Bridgend County Borough Council. Since 1999 the ward was represented by the Labour Party's Mel Nott. Councillor Nott, who became leader of the county council, retired before the May 2017 county elections.

In January 2019 a consultation period began, to review the wards and representation in the county. The proposals included merging the Sarn and neighbouring Ynysawdre ward. The new ward, effective from the 2022 local elections, was named "St Bride's and Ynysawdre", electing three county borough councillors.

Notable residents
Gareth Thomas, rugby player

References

External links
www.geograph.co.uk : photos of Sarn and surrounding area

Villages in Bridgend County Borough
Wards of Bridgend County Borough